The 2005 Giro d'Italia was the 88th edition of the Giro d'Italia, one of cycling's Grand Tours. It began in Reggio Calabria with a  prologue. The race came to a close with a  mass-start road stage that stretched from Albese con Cassano to Milan. Twenty two teams entered the race that was won by the Italian Paolo Savoldelli of the  team. Second and third were the Italian Gilberto Simoni and Venezuelan José Rujano.

Five riders led the race over eight occasions before Savoldelli gained the lead after the Giro's thirteenth stage. The Giro was first led by Australian Brett Lancaster, who won the race's opening prologue. He lost the lead the next day to Paolo Bettini, who gained the race lead three separate times before Savoldelli took over. Ivan Basso was the leader of the race for two days, before he lost the lead to Savoldelli who then held that lead until the race's conclusion.

Having previously won the general classification in 2002, Savoldelli became the nineteenth rider to repeat as winner of the Giro d'Italia. Amongst the other classifications that the race awarded, Paolo Bettini of the  team won the points classification, Selle Italia Colombia rider José Rujano won the mountains classification, and Italian Stefano Zanini won the intergiro classification.  finished as the winners of the Trofeo Fast Team classification, ranking each of the twenty-two teams contesting the race by lowest cumulative time.

Teams

Twenty-two teams were invited by the race organizers to participate in the 2005 edition of the Giro d'Italia. Twenty of the teams were UCI ProTour teams, while Ceramica Panaria-Navigare and Colombia-Selle Italia were wild card teams invited by the organizers. Each team sent a squad of nine riders, which meant that the race started with a peloton of 198 cyclists. From the riders that began the race, 153 made it to the finish in Milan.

The teams entering the race were:

Route and stages

The route for the 2005 Giro d'Italia was unveiled by race director Angelo Zomegnan on 23 January 2005 in Milan. It contained three time trial events, all of which were individual. The organizers divided the remaining eighteen stages into three categories: flat stages, medium mountain stages, and mountain stages. Ten of the stages were declared flat stages. Of the eight stages remaining, three stages were designated medium mountain stages and five were ranked as mountain stages. In the stages containing categorized climbs, four had summit finishes: stage 11, to Zoldo Alto; stage 13, to Urtijëi; stage 17, to Colle di Tenda; and stage 19, to Sestriere. The organizers chose to include two rest days. When compared to the previous year's race, the race was  longer, contained the same amount of rest days and one more individual time trial event. In addition, both races contained a prologue to open the race.

The fifteenth was originally intended to be  and to start in Livigno. The route originally had the riders crossing the Forcola di Livigno, a mountain located  outside of the original start in Livigno, but due to the bad weather at the base and top of the climb the organizers were forced to exclude the pass.

Race overview

The Giro began with a  prologue that navigated through the streets of Reggio Calabria. The event was won by Australian Brett Lancaster who won by a .289 second margin over the second placed rider Matteo Tosatto. After the last competing rider took the course, famed sprinter Mario Cipollini took the course for a final farewell after announcing his retirement ten days beforehand. The Giro's first stage came down to an uphill, bunch sprint that Paolo Bettini won. Along with the stage victory, Bettini took the overall lead of the race. The second stage ended in another sprint finish, which Robbie McEwen won and also saw him take the race lead. Liquigas-Bianchi's Danilo Di Luca lunged ahead of Damiano Cunego to win the stage, while the race lead fell back into Bettini's hands. The fourth stage closed with a sprint finish that Italian Paolo Bettini won. However, Bettini was later disqualified after the judges saw that he caused fellow sprinter Baden Cooke to fall, which gave the stage victory to second-place finisher Luca Mazzanti.

The seventh stage saw a breakaway succeed again, as Liberty Seguros-Würth rider Koldo Gil took the downhill stage win. Danilo Di Luca regained the lead of the race as the time gaps widened due to the climb that was placed shortly before the finish. Stage eight was a  individual time trial that was won by American David Zabriskie. Di Luca placed tenth overall and maintain the race leader's pink jersey, while the general classification contenders Ivan Basso and Paolo Savoldelli gained valuable seconds over Di Luca. Alessandro Petacchi won the next stage by means of a bunch sprint, while the general classification remained largely unaltered. Stage 10 took place after a rest day. The stage again came down to a bunch sprint that was won by Australian Robbie McEwen, who captured his second stage win of the Giro.

Stage 11 was the first big mountain stage of the 2005 Giro d'Italia and it began with a breakaway that was eventually swept after the first climb of the day. Ivan Basso attacked with  remaining in the stage and only Paolo Savoldelli was able to keep pace with him.  The two raced to the top of the Zoldo Alto and Savoldelli won the sprint to the line, while Basso claimed the race lead. The twelfth stage of the race was downhill after the lone categorized climb of the Passo san Pellegrino.  The stage ultimately came down to a field sprint, which Alessandro Petacchi won. The Giro's thirteenth stage saw a breakaway succeed as Colombian Iván Parra beat out his fellow breakaway members for the stage win. Paolo Savoldelli claimed the overall lead after Ivan Basso lost over a minute as he was suffering from a gastric problem. The next stage, stage 14, contained the Cima Coppi of the 2005 Giro d'Italia, the Passo dello Stelvio, along with other climbs of lesser severity. Iván Parra struck again by winning the stage by almost two minutes over the second-place finisher. Ivan Basso lost even more time due to his illness, while general classification contenders Danilo Di Luca and Gilberto Simoni gained valuable seconds over the race leader Paolo Savoldelli.

The fifteenth stage's start was moved from Livigno to Villa di Tirano and the route was shortened by  due to poor weather conditions on the stage's first scheduled mountain pass, the Forcola di Livigno. With the exclusion of the uphill earlier portion of the stage, the route was relatively flat which led to the stage ending in a bunch sprint that Fassa Bortolo's Alessandro Petacchi won. After the second rest day, the riders began stage sixteen of the Giro. A breakaway containing eighteen men got away from the peloton and stayed away for the length of the stage. Christophe Le Mével out-sprinted his fellow breakaway members to win the stage and earn his first professional victory. The race's seventeenth stage contained a summit finish on the Colle di Tenda. While on the final climb of the day, the race was headed by a lead group that contained the race leader Paolo Savoldelli and general classification favorites Ivan Basso and José Rujano. Basso slipped away with  left to go in the climb and win the stage.

Stage 18 was an individual time trial that stretched  Chieri to Turin. Team CSC's Ivan Basso won the stage by nine seconds over Russian Vladimir Karpets. The penultimate stage of the Giro featured a summit finish on the fabled Sestriere. The race leader Paolo Savoldelli was in trouble throughout the stage and his lead was in jeopardy. However, on the final climb of the Sestriere he received aid from two riders and made it to the finish two minutes after the stage winner José Rujano. Savoldelli's lead shrank to twenty-eight seconds over the second placed rider Gilberto Simoni. The twentieth and final stage of the 2005 Giro d'Italia came ended with a bunch sprint in the streets of Milan. Italian Alessandro Petacchi edged out Erik Zabel and Robert Förster to win the stage. Savoldelli won his second Giro d'Italia after crossing the finish in 24th place on the stage.

Success in stages was limited to ten of the competing teams, six of which achieved multiple stage victories, while five individual riders won multiple stages. The riders that won more than once were Robbie McEwen in stages 2, 6, 10, Danilo di Luca in stages 3 and 5, Alessandro Petacchi in stages 9, 12, 15, and 20, and Iván Parra in stages 13 and 14, and Ivan Basso in stages 17 and 18.  won two stages, with Brett Lancaster in the prologue and Luca Mazzanti in stage 4.  won three stages with Robbie McEwen.  won two stages with Danilo di Luca.  won three stages, with David Zabriskie in the stage 8 time trial and two stages with Ivan Basso.  won four stages with Alessandro Petacchi.  won three stages, with Iván Parra in two stages and José Rujano in stage 19. Quick Step-Innergetic's Paolo Bettini won stage 1 by out-sprinting the rest of the field. Liberty Seguros-Würth rider Koldo Gil won stage 7 by means of a long breakaway. Discovery Channel's Paolo Savoldelli won stage 11 through a last second attack, as did Crédit Agricole rider Christophe Le Mével in stage 16.

Classification leadership

Four different jerseys were worn during the 2005 Giro d'Italia. The leader of the general classification – calculated by adding the stage finish times of each rider, and allowing time bonuses for the first three finishers on mass-start stages – wore a pink jersey. This classification is the most important of the race, and its winner is considered as the winner of the Giro.

For the points classification, which awarded a purple (or cyclamen) jersey to its leader, cyclists were given points for finishing a stage in the top 15; additional points could also be won in intermediate sprints. The green jersey was awarded to the mountains classification leader. In this ranking, points were won by reaching the summit of a climb ahead of other cyclists. Each climb was ranked as either first, second or third category, with more points available for higher category climbs. The Cima Coppi, the race's highest point of elevation, awarded more points than the other first category climbs. The Cima Coppi for this Giro was the Passo dello Stelvio. The first rider to cross the Stelvio was Selle Italia Colombia's José Rujano. The intergiro classification was marked by a blue jersey. The calculation for the intergiro is similar to that of the general classification, in each stage there is a midway point that the riders pass through a point and where their time is stopped. As the race goes on, their times compiled and the person with the lowest time is the leader of the intergiro classification and wears the blue jersey. Although no jersey was awarded, there was also one classification for the teams, in which the stage finish times of the best three cyclists per team were added; the leading team was the one with the lowest total time.

There were also two classifications for the teams. The classification was the Trofeo Fast Team. In this classification, the times of the best three cyclists per team on each stage were added; the leading team was the team with the lowest total time; the Trofeo Super Team was a team points classification, with the top 20 placed riders on each stage earning points (20 for first place, 19 for second place and so on, down to a single point for 20th) for their team.

The rows in the following table correspond to the jerseys awarded after that stage was run.

Final standings

General classification

Points classification

Mountains classification

Intergiro classification

Trofeo Fast Team classification

Trofeo Super Team classification

Minor classifications

Other less well-known classifications, whose leaders did not receive a special jersey, were awarded during the Giro. Other awards included the Combativity classification, which was a compilation of points gained for position on crossing intermediate sprints, mountain passes and stage finishes. Venezuelan José Rujano won the most combative classification. The Azzurri d'Italia classification was based on finishing order, but points were awarded only to the top three finishers in each stage. Alessandro Petacchi won the Azzurri d'Italia classification. The Trofeo Fuga Piaggio classification rewarded riders who took part in a breakaway at the head of the field, each rider in an escape of ten or fewer riders getting one point for each kilometre that the group stayed clear. The classification was won by Sven Krauß.

References

 
2005 UCI ProTour
2005
2005 in Italian sport
May 2005 sports events in Europe